Beaupré is a ville in the Canadian province of Quebec, located in La Côte-de-Beaupré Regional County Municipality. The town is along the Saint Lawrence River and Route 138 at the mouth of the Sainte-Anne-du-Nord River.

Mont-Sainte-Anne, the highest skiing station in the eastern part of Canada, is located in Beaupré. It is also one of the town's major sport attractions.

History
The area has been inhabited since the beginning of the New France colony. In the 17th century, Breton sailors, when landing on the coastal plains, reputedly exclaimed: "Oh! le beau pré" ("Oh! the beautiful meadow"). The fused form of Beaupré has been in use since at least 1636 when the Beaupré Company was established. Its parish formed out of two of the oldest parishes of Quebec, Sainte-Anne-de-Beaupré and Saint-Joachim. Its population in 1666 was 533 inhabitants, comparable to Quebec with 547 inhabitants.

In 1928, the place was incorporated as the Parish Municipality of Notre-Dame-du-Rosaire but its name was changed to Beaupré that same year in order to avoid confusion with several other namesake parishes. In 1962, the parish municipality gained town status and became Ville de Beaupré.

Demographics 

Population trend:
 Population in 2021: 4,117 (2016 to 2021 population change: 9.7%)
 Population in 2016: 3,754
 Population in 2011: 3,439 (2006 to 2011 population change: 14.4%)
 Population in 2006: 3,006 (2001 to 2006 population change: 8.9%)
 Population in 2001: 2,761
 Population in 1996: 2,799
 Population in 1991: 2,676

Mother tongue:
 English as first language: 1.6%
 French as first language: 95.9%
 English and French as first language: 0%
 Other as first language: 2.5%

Industries 
 Caron et Guay, doors and windows

One of the region's major employers, AbitibiBowater closed its plant there in October 2009. On , the city authorized the destruction of the old 1927 plant following various soliciting attempts.

See also
La Côte-de-Beaupré, a Regional County Municipality (RCM)
St. Lawrence River
Rivière Sainte-Anne
Rivière aux Chiens
Rivière des Sept Crans
Chenal de l'Île d'Orléans
List of cities in Quebec

References

Cities and towns in Quebec
Incorporated places in Capitale-Nationale